Salut may refer to:

Places
 Îles de Salut, also known as Salvation's Islands
 La Salut, neighbourhood in the Gràcia district of Barcelona, Catalonia, Spain
 Salut, Armenia, a village in the province of Shirak

Other
 Salut, an implementation of Telepathy (software)
 "Salut" (song), a 1976 song by Joe Dassin
 Aranza Salut (born 1991), Argentinian tennis player

See also
 Salute
 Port Salut, a type of cheese
 Port-Salut, Haiti